Vera Lindsay (née Poliakoff; 27 November 191115 June 1992) was a British Shakespearean actress.

Career
Vera Lindsay performed at The Old Vic during the 1930s alongside Laurence Olivier and John Gielgud, and under the direction of Michel Saint-Denis.

She also appeared in a number of early TV productions including Annajanska the Bolshevik Empress (1939), Katharine and Petruchio (1939), The Tempest (1939), Twelfth Night (1939)  and Spellbound (1941)

Personal life
Lindsay was daughter of Vladimir Poliakoff. She was married to:
Major Percy Basil Harmsworth Burton
News Chronicle editor Sir Gerald Barry; had two sons, one of whom, Stephen, was a stage director and performing arts administrator
John Russell CBE, a British art critic

Selected filmography
 Spellbound (1941)

References

British stage actresses
British Shakespearean actresses
20th-century British actresses
British television actresses
1911 births
1992 deaths